Ghakka Mitter, is a town and Union Council in Wazirabad Tehsil, Gujranwala District, Punjab, Pakistan.. It comes under TMA Wazirabad (Tehsil Municipal Administration). Its distance from Wazirabad is about 2.5 km. Ghakka Mitter has 8 mosques, 3 government schools, 3 private English medium schools and has approximately 13,000 residents.

See also

 Gujranwala
 Wazirabad

References

Cities and towns in Gujranwala District
Populated places in Wazirabad Tehsil
Union councils of Wazirabad Tehsil